Nick Sandlin (born January 10, 1997) is an American professional baseball pitcher for the Cleveland Guardians of Major League Baseball (MLB). He made his MLB debut in 2021.

Amateur career
Sandlin - a sidearm style pitcher - attended Greenbrier High School in Evans, Georgia. He enrolled at the University of Southern Mississippi and played college baseball for the Southern Miss Golden Eagles. In 2017, he played collegiate summer baseball with the Hyannis Harbor Hawks of the Cape Cod Baseball League. In 2018, his junior year, Sandlin won the C Spire Ferriss Trophy, given to the best collegiate baseball player in Mississippi. and was named Conference USA's Baseball Pitcher of the Year and the National Pitcher of the Year Award from Perfect Game/Rawlings.

Professional career
The Cleveland Indians selected Sandlin in the second round, with the 67th overall selection, of the 2018 MLB draft. He signed with Cleveland, receiving a $750,000 signing bonus. He spent the 2018 season with the AZL Indians, Lake County Captains, Lynchburg Hillcats, and Akron RubberDucks, compiling a combined 2–0 record and 3.00 ERA with 36 strikeouts in 24 total relief innings pitched between the four clubs.

In 2019, he played for the Akron RubberDucks and Columbus Clippers. He went a combined 1–0 with a 2.39 ERA over  innings. On July 1, it was announced that he would miss the rest of the season due to a right forearm strain.  Sandlin did not play in a game in 2020 due to the cancellation of the Minor League Baseball season because of the COVID-19 pandemic.

On April 30, 2021, Sandlin was promoted to the major leagues for the first time. On May 1, Sandlin made his MLB debut against the Chicago White Sox and struck out White Sox outfielder Adam Eaton for his first major league punchout.

Personal life
His older brother, Jake, also played baseball for Greenbrier and Southern Miss.

References

External links

Living people
1997 births
People from Evans, Georgia
Baseball players from Georgia (U.S. state)
Major League Baseball pitchers
Cleveland Indians players
Cleveland Guardians players
Southern Miss Golden Eagles baseball players
Hyannis Harbor Hawks players
All-American college baseball players
Arizona League Indians players
Lake County Captains players
Lynchburg Hillcats players
Akron RubberDucks players
Columbus Clippers players